Het Oude Noorden (English: The Old North) is a 1993 IDTV drama television series, set in Rotterdam. The series is a remake of the British series EastEnders, which follows families as they go about their lives.

Cast
 Loes Vos – Bep Martens
 Ton Pompert – Willem Martens
 Aletta de Nes – Carolien Martens
 Helen Pavias Martens – Jozefien Ottevanger
 Paul van Soest – Fred Ottevanger
 Tim Meeuws – Kroegbaas Ger Visser
 Dana Dool – Ankie Visser
 Nora Kretz – Greetje Kuyper
 Jaap Maarleveld – Dokter Ruben Klein
 Amber de Grauw - Tamara Visser
 Cahit Olmez - Sheref Elmaci
 Martin Schwab - Frankie Portier
 Cynthia Abma - Poel van Delden
 Pepijn Gunneweg - Sjoerd Martens
 Hans Breetveld - Johnnie Crooswijk
 Froukje van den Akker - Bianca Ottevanger
 Jaloe Maat - Vera Firat
 Coen van Vlijmen - Vic Ottevanger
 Ramon Ramnath - Jimmy Singh
 Kietje Sewrattan - Aisha Singh
 Vefa Ocal - Avares Firat
 Dennis Rudge - Jeffrey Martina

Episodes

References

Dutch television soap operas
Dutch-language television shows
1993 Dutch television series debuts
1993 Dutch television series endings
Rotterdam in fiction
Dutch television series based on British television series
Television shows set in the Netherlands